Yeditepe is a town in Yayladağı district of Hatay Province, Turkey. The population of the town was 1793  as of 2012.

References

Populated places in Hatay Province
Towns in Turkey
Yayladağ District